Dolní Lhota is a municipality and village in Ostrava-City District in the Moravian-Silesian Region of the Czech Republic. It has about 1,500 inhabitants.

Transport
Trams from Ostrava run to Dolní Lhota. There are three tram stops: U Obory, Dolní Lhota and Dolní Lhota osada, and three bus stops.

References

Villages in Ostrava-City District